Burquitlam station is a rapid transit station on the Millennium Line, part of Metro Vancouver's SkyTrain system, and is located in Coquitlam, a suburb of Vancouver, British Columbia, Canada. It opened on December 2, 2016, with the rest of the Evergreen Extension and is named after the Burquitlam neighbourhood in which it is located.

The station features a transit exchange (including a direct connection to Simon Fraser University), HandyDart area, night bus service to and from Downtown Vancouver, and bike lockers and racks.

Station information

Station layout

Entrances
Burquitlam is served by a single entrance facing the north end of the station. The entrance is located on the east side of Clarke Road.

Transit connections

Burquitlam station provides an on- and off-street transit exchange on Clarke Road, between Como Lake and Smith avenues. The station is in Translink's Fare Zone 3 which means customers must pay additional fare if they cross zone boundaries using SeaBus or SkyTrain during peak hours (from start of transit service in the morning to 6:30 pm, excluding weekends and holidays). This additional amount is determined by the number of boundaries crossed. All bus and HandyDART travel is 1-zone.

References

External links
Burquitlam Station

Buildings and structures in Coquitlam
Millennium Line stations
Evergreen Extension stations
Railway stations in Canada opened in 2016
2016 establishments in British Columbia